The 1993 DieHard 500 was the 18th stock car race of the 1993 NASCAR Winston Cup Series season and the 25th iteration of the event. The race was held on Sunday, May 2, 1993, before an audience of 100,000 in Lincoln, Alabama at Talladega Superspeedway, a 2.66 miles (4.28 km) permanent triangle-shaped superspeedway. The race took the scheduled 188 laps to complete. In one of the closest finishes in NASCAR Winston Cup Series history, Richard Childress Racing driver Dale Earnhardt would manage to best out a last-lap challenge against Morgan–McClure Motorsports driver Ernie Irvan by 0.005 seconds at the finish line, with Earnhardt managing to extend his dominant driver's championship lead over the rest of the field with the victory. The victory was Earnhardt's 59th career NASCAR Winston Cup Series victory and his sixth and final victory of the season. To fill out the top three, Roush Racing driver Mark Martin would finish third.

The race was marred by two separate major incidents throughout the race. On lap 70, a five-car incident featured Active Motorsports driver Jimmy Horton flipping over the protective outside wall in turn one, meant to keep cars within the track. While Horton wasn't seriously hurt, in the same accident, owner-driver and Birmingham, Alabama native Stanley Smith would suffer a basilar skull fracture and partial paralysis of the right side of his body after slamming his car into the turn one wall, spilling blood on most of his racing firesuit. After being taken to a Birmingham hospital, Smith would recover for 40 days until he was eventually discharged. The second major crash would occur on lap 132, when Neil Bonnett's car would go airborne, flip over the damaged car of Ted Musgrave, and smash into the protective catch-fence on the track's front-stretch that was meant to protect spectators. Nine fans would be injured due to the crash. Bonnett, making a one-off appearance since retiring in 1990, was uninjured and would eventually decide to commentate the rest of the race for CBS.

Background 

Talladega Superspeedway, originally known as Alabama International Motor Superspeedway (AIMS), is a motorsports complex located north of Talladega, Alabama. It is located on the former Anniston Air Force Base in the small city of Lincoln. The track is a tri-oval and was constructed in the 1960s by the International Speedway Corporation, a business controlled by the France family. Talladega is most known for its steep banking and the unique location of the start/finish line that's located just past the exit to pit road. The track currently hosts the NASCAR series such as the NASCAR Cup Series, Xfinity Series and the Camping World Truck Series. Talladega is the longest NASCAR oval, a  tri-oval like the Daytona International Speedway, which also is a  tri-oval.

Entry list 

 (R) denotes rookie driver.

Qualifying 
Qualifying was split into two rounds. The first round was held on Friday, July 22, at 4:00 PM EST. Each driver would have one lap to set a time. During the first round, the top 20 drivers in the round would be guaranteed a starting spot in the race. If a driver was not able to guarantee a spot in the first round, they had the option to scrub their time from the first round and try and run a faster lap time in a second round qualifying run, held on Saturday, July 23, at 11:30 AM EST. As with the first round, each driver would have one lap to set a time. For this specific race, positions 21-40 would be decided on time, and depending on who needed it, a select amount of positions were given to cars who had not otherwise qualified but were high enough in owner's points; up to two provisionals were given. If needed, a past champion who did not qualify on either time or provisionals could use a champion's provisional, adding one more spot to the field.

Five drivers would fail to qualify.

Full qualifying results

Race results

Standings after the race 

Drivers' Championship standings

Note: Only the first 10 positions are included for the driver standings.

References 

1993 NASCAR Winston Cup Series
NASCAR races at Talladega Superspeedway
July 1993 sports events in the United States
1993 in sports in Alabama